The 1924–25 Rugby Union County Championship was the 32nd edition of England's premier rugby union club competition at the time.

Leicestershire won the competition for the first time after defeating Gloucestershire in the final.

Final

See also
 English rugby union system
 Rugby union in England

References

Rugby Union County Championship
County Championship (rugby union) seasons